The 2018 Mnet Asian Music Awards ceremony, organized by CJ E&M through its music channel Mnet, took place from December 10 through December 14, 2018 (dubbed as "MAMA Week") in South Korea, Japan and Hong Kong. The ceremony was the first Mnet Asian Music Awards hosted in South Korea in nine years, the 20th ceremony in the show's history, and the second ceremony which took place in three locations. This was also the first ceremony broadcast worldwide online via YouTube. The three days event generated over 50 million messages sent on Twitter.
 
Four Grand Prizes (Daesangs) were given throughout the ceremonies; Album of the Year, Artist of the Year, Song of the Year and the addition of Worldwide Icon of the Year.

Shows
"2018 MAMA Premiere in Korea" celebrated and honored new artists in both South Korea and other parts of Asia. "2018 MAMA Fans' Choice in Japan" awarded artists in fan voted categories and also announced the first Worldwide Icon of the Year. "2018 MAMA in Hong Kong" was the main event and the show's finale. The show gave awards to the artists that made great achievements in 2018.

Criteria

Winners and nominees
Online voting opened on the official MAMA' website, the Mwave app, TikTok, and Twitter, on November 1, 2018, one hour after nominees were announced. Voting ended on December 9, 2018.

Winners are listed first and highlighted in boldface.

Main Award

Favorite Award

Special Awards

Multiple awards
The following artist(s) received three or more awards:

Multiple nominations
The following artist(s) received seven or more nominations (excluding the special awards):

Performers 
The following individuals and groups, listed in order of appearance, performed musical numbers.

MAMA Premiere in Korea

MAMA Fans’ Choice in Japan

2018 MAMA in Hong Kong

Presenters 

Korea 
 Jung Hae-in – main host
 Bae Yoon-young and Lee Ki-woo – presented Best New Asian Artist (Thailand & Vietnam)
 Jung Hae-in – presented Professional Categories
 Ji-soo and Jung Chae-yeon – presented Best New Asian Artist (China, Indonesia & Japan)
 Jung Hae-in – presented New Challenger Performance
 Kang Seung-hyun – presented Best of Next Award
 Kim Yu-ri and Hong Jong-hyun – presented Best New Artists
 Kim So-hyun – presented DDP Best Trend Award

Japan
 Park Bo-gum – main host
 Yoo Hyun-min and Lee Da-hee – presented Worldwide Fan Choice Award
 Minue – presented Favorite Dance Artist (Japan)
 Ha Seok-jin – presented Favorite Music Video
 Kwon Hyuk-soo – presented Worldwide Fans Choice Award
 Choi Tae-joon and Lee Sung-kyung – presented Worldwide Fan Choice Award
 Matsushige Yutaka and Shin Ah-young – presented Favorite Vocal Artist
 Yang Se-jong – presented Favorite Male Dance Artist
 Jung Il-woo and Jung So-min – presented Worldwide Fans Choice Award
 Ha Seok-jin and Choi Kang-hee – presented Favorite Female Dance Artist and Worldwide Fans Choice Award
 Jang Hyuk – presented Worldwide Icon of the Year

Hong Kong
 Song Joong-ki – main host
 Kim Dong-wook and Kim Da-mi – presented Best Unit
 Lee Yi-kyung and Moon Ga-bi – presented Best Vocal Performance Solo
 Yoon Jong-bin and Lee Sun-bin – presented Best OST
 In Gyo-jin and So Yi-hyun – presented New Asian Artist
 Kwon Hyuk-soo and Bae Jung-nam – presented Mwave Global Fan Choice
 Lee Jun-hyung and Seo Eun-su – presented Best Dance Performance – Female Group and TikTok Most Popular Artist
 Park Sung-woong – monologue 
 Song Joong-ki, Jackson (Got7), Daehwi (Wanna One) and RM (BTS) – presented Janet Jackson Inspiration Award
 Park Sung-woong and Lee El – presented Best Asian Style and Discovery of the Year
 Ahn Jae-hyun & Kim Sa-rang – presented Best Male Artist & Best Dance Performance – Solo
 Lee Seung-chul and Lee Yo-won – presented Best Music Video
 Kim Jong-kook – presented Best Asian Artist (Mandarin)
 Seo Hyun-jin – presented Best Female Group
 Ahn Jae-hyun and Jung Rye-won – presented Best Dance Performance – Male Group
 Lee Jin-wook – presented Best Female Artist
 Kim Sung-ryung – presented Best Male Group
 Angelababy – presented Album of the Year
 Cha Seung-won – presented Song of the Year
 Hwang Jung-min – presented Artist of the Year

Broadcast

The red carpet and ceremonies of the 2018 Mnet Asian Music Awards were broadcast worldwide via Mnet, across CJ E&M channels and other international networks and online via Mnet K-pop's YouTube account, V Live, and Mnet's official website.

References

External links 
 Mnet Asian Music Awards official website (English

Mnet
Mnet
MAMA Awards ceremonies